Edith Maxwell (born 1952) is an Agatha Award-winning American mystery author also currently writing as Maddie Day. She writes cozy, traditional, and historical mysteries set in the United States.

Biography
Maxwell was born in Pasadena and grew up in the Los Angeles suburb of Temple City with two older sisters and a younger brother. Her father taught high school and her mother was a Girl Scout leader and a real estate appraiser. Maxwell was an exchange student with AFS Intercultural Programs in Brazil for a year in 1970. She holds a BA (linguistics, 1974) from University of California, Irvine, and a PhD (linguistics, 1981) from Indiana University.

Prior to writing fiction full time, she worked as an auto mechanic, taught conversational English in Japan and independent childbirth classes in Massachusetts, owned and operated a small certified-organic farm, wrote free-lance articles, and most recently produced software documentation for several hi-tech companies in the Boston area. Besides Brazil and Japan she has also lived in Mali and Burkina Faso.

Authorial career
Maxwell’s first published fiction was in the Pasadena Star-News, where she won a children’s fiction contest in 1961.
Her first published short story as an adult was in 1996, and her first novel appeared in 2012. She is a lifetime member of Sisters in Crime and served as President of the New England chapter for two years. She is also a member of Mystery Writers of America, the Short Mystery Fiction Society, and the Historical Novel Society. She has been a full-time mystery author since 2013. Maxwell has two dozen mystery novels and a novella in print with more in process.

Maxwell decided to write cozy mysteries because "I don’t want to read noir or nail-biter thrillers. Our world is scary and messy enough. When I’m finished reading a book, I don’t want to feel worse about society. That’s what I write, too."

Bibliography

Local Foods Mysteries (as Edith Maxwell)
A Tine to Live, a Tine to Die June 2013	Kensington
‘Til Dirt Do Us Part June 2014 	Kensington
Farmed and Dangerous May 2015 	Kensington
Murder Most Fowl May 2016 	Kensington
Mulch Ado About Murder May 2017 	Kensington

Country Store Mysteries (as Maddie Day)
Flipped for Murder	October 2015	Kensington
Grilled for Murder	May 2016	Kensington 
When the Grits Hit the Fan	March 2017	Kensington
Biscuits and Slashed Browns	January 2018	Kensington
Death Over Easy	July 2018	Kensington
Strangled Eggs and Ham 	July 2019	Kensington
Christmas Cocoa Murder	Sept 2019	Kensington
Nacho Average Murder	July 2020	Kensington
Candy Slain Murder         Sept 2020	Kensington

Cozy Capers Book Group Mysteries (as Maddie Day)
Murder on Cape Cod	December 2018	Kensington
Murder at the Taffy Shop March 2020	Kensington

Quaker Midwife Mysteries (as Edith Maxwell)
Delivering the Truth	April 2016	Midnight Ink
Called to Justice	April 2017	Midnight Ink
Turning the Tide	April 2018	Midnight Ink
Charity’s Burden	April 2019	Midnight Ink
Judge Thee Not	September 2019	Beyond the Page
Taken Too Soon     September 2020  Beyond the Page

Lauren Rousseau Mysteries (as Tace Baker)
Speaking of Murder	September 2012	Barking Rain, reissued in 2020 by Beyond the Page
Bluffing is Murder	November 2014	Barking Rain, reissued in 2020 by Beyond the Page

Awards and recognition
 2014 Agatha Award nomination for Best Short Story, “Just Desserts for Johnny”
 2015 Agatha Award nomination for Best Short Story, “A Questionable Death”
 2016 Agatha Award nomination for Best Historical Novel, Delivering the Truth
 2017 Agatha Award nomination for Best Historical Novel for Called to Justice
 2018 Agatha Award nomination for Best Historical Novel, Turning the Tide
 2019 Agatha Award winner for Best Historical Novel, Charity's Burden
 2016 Macavity Award (Sue Feder Historical Mystery Award) nomination, Delivering the Truth
 2019 Macavity Award (Sue Feder Historical Mystery Award) nomination, Charity's Burden
 2016 Agatha Award nomination for Best Short Story, “The Mayor and the Midwife”
 2013 Honorable Mention in the Al Blanchard Short Crime Fiction contest, “Breaking the Silence”

References

External links

1952 births
Living people
21st-century American novelists
American mystery writers
Women mystery writers
21st-century American women writers
Writers from Los Angeles
People from Temple City, California
American Quakers
Writers from Massachusetts
People from Amesbury, Massachusetts
Writers from Pasadena, California
University of California, Irvine alumni
Pseudonymous women writers
21st-century pseudonymous writers